Elections to the Labour Party's Shadow Cabinet (more formally, its "Parliamentary Committee") occurred in December 1971.  In addition to the 12 members elected, the Leader (Harold Wilson), Deputy Leader (Roy Jenkins), Labour Chief Whip (Bob Mellish), Chairman of the Parliamentary Labour Party (Douglas Houghton), Labour Leader in the House of Lords (Baron Shackleton), and Labour Chief Whip in the Lords (Baron Beswick) were automatically members.  The Labour Lords elected one further member, Baron Champion.

Lever and Thomson both resigned in April 1972, and were replaced by Prentice and Silkin, the first two unsuccessful candidates.  Jenkins resigned as deputy leader in the same month, and was replaced by Edward Short.  This created an additional vacancy, and because the next two unsuccessful candidates had tied on votes, a run-off election was held to decide who would join the shadow cabinet.  On 3 May, Barbara Castle defeated Eric Heffer by 111 votes to 89, to take the position.

The 12 winners of the election are listed below:

References

1971
Labour Party Shadow Cabinet election
Labour Party (UK) Shadow Cabinet election